Union Bank of Colombo PLC, commonly referred to as UBC, is a commercial bank in Sri Lanka. It is licensed by the Central Bank of Sri Lanka, the central bank and national banking regulator.

Overview 
Union Bank of Colombo PLC is one of the top five banks in Sri Lanka in market capitalization as well as one of the country's fastest growing Financial Services Groups. , the bank operated 66 branches and 121 automatic teller machines (ATM) across the island nation.  The bank offers a range of products and services to Retail, SME and Corporate segments.

History 
UBC was established in 1995 as the eighth indigenous commercial bank with DFCC Bank, The Great Eastern Life Assurance Company Limited as its founding shareholders. The bank's shares were listed on the Colombo Stock Exchange in March 2016 after an initial public offering that was oversubscribed by 350 percent. The IPO was to enable the Bank to comply with the Central Bank Capital Adequacy norms.

Subsidiaries 
Other than its banking business, Union Bank of Colombo provides additional financial services through its two subsidiaries:
 National Asset Management Limited (51% shareholding), an asset management company in Sri Lanka offering unit trusts and private portfolios for institutional investors and individual clients.
 UB Finance Company Limited (66.17% shareholding), a finance company offering financial services such as accepting deposits, maintaining savings accounts, lease financing, hire purchase, vehicle loans, mortgage loans, pawning, factoring, working capital financing and real estate.

Ownership 
The stock of Union Bank of Colombo PLC is listed on the Colombo Stock Exchange under the ticker symbol "UBC". , the largest shareholders in the bank's stock were:

Governance 
A twelve-person board of directors governs UBC with Atul Malik as the Chairman and Indrajit Wickramasinghe as the chief executive officer.

See also 

 List of banks in Sri Lanka
 Central Bank of Sri Lanka

References

External links
 Official website of Union Bank of Colombo

Banks of Sri Lanka
Banks established in 1995
1995 establishments in Sri Lanka
Companies listed on the Colombo Stock Exchange
Sri Lankan companies established in 1995